The Midwinter Pottery was founded as W.R. Midwinter by William Robinson Midwinter in Burslem, Stoke-on-Trent in 1910 and had become one of England's largest potteries by the late 1930s with more than 700 employees.  Production of Midwinter pottery ceased in 1987.

History
In the 1950s, under the leadership of the director Roy Midwinter, the company became one of the leading innovators in British tableware production. A large part of this was due to the noted ceramicists and designers who worked for the pottery, including Jessie Tait, Terence Conran, Hugh Casson, John Russell and Peter Scott. The Midwinter Pottery was also an innovator in producing 'accessories' to their basic dinner services and tea sets. The Clayburn Pottery, a sister company to Midwinter, made pieces such as lamp bases that could be added to a Midwinter dinner service. In the 1960s, the Spanish Garden design, which was very successful on dinner ware and tea sets, adorned articles such as a bread bin and chopping board.

The costs involved in developing two unsuccessful new ranges weakened the company, and there was a takeover by J. & G. Meakin in 1968. In 1970 Meakin was itself bought out by Wedgwood. Pottery was produced under the Midwinter name from their factory until 1987.

Many of the pieces produced by Midwinter in the 1950s and 1960s have become highly collectible, being typical of the styles of those eras.

References

Citations

General references

MIDWINTER A Collector's guide - Alan Peat, Cameron and Hollis, 1992,  
Midwinter Pottery - Steven Jenkins, Richard Dennis, 2003, 

Ceramics manufacturers of England
Companies based in Stoke-on-Trent
Staffordshire pottery
Waterford Wedgwood
Manufacturing companies established in 1910
Manufacturing companies disestablished in 1987